The Pumping Station Bridge was a covered bridge spanning Rickreall Creek, near Ellendale, Oregon, in the United States. The bridge collapsed during a flood on November 24, 1986. It was listed on the National Register of Historic Places (NRHP) in 1979. The bridge was removed from the NRHP in 1987 after the collapse.

See also
 List of bridges on the National Register of Historic Places in Oregon
 List of Oregon covered bridges
 National Register of Historic Places listings in Polk County, Oregon

References

Covered bridges in Oregon
Former bridges in the United States
Former National Register of Historic Places in Oregon
Transportation buildings and structures in Polk County, Oregon
Wooden bridges in Oregon